Jerome P. Kassirer (born 1932 in Buffalo, New York) is an American nephrologist, medical researcher, and professor at Tufts University School of Medicine. He was the editor-in-chief of the New England Journal of Medicine from 1991 to 1999.

Education and academic career
Kassirer received his Doctor of Medicine degree (M.D.) from the University of Buffalo in 1957, and trained in nephrology at New England Medical Center as a senior resident from 1961 to 1962. He joined the faculty of Tufts University School of Medicine as an instructor in 1961, where he has been a professor since 1974. His previous positions at Tufts include acting chairman of the department of medicine (1974–75), vice chairman of the department of medicine (1979-1991), and Sara Murray Jordan Professor of Medicine (1987-1991).

Medical career
Kassirer practiced nephrology at New England Medical Center from 1961 to 1991, where he was an associate physician-in-chief from 1971 to 1991 and acting physician-in-chief from 1976 to 1977.

Career at the New England Journal of Medicine
Kassirer was first named editor-in-chief of the New England Journal of Medicine (NEJM) in 1991. As editor, he increased the number of foreign scientists on the journal's editorial board, which drew more submissions from foreign scientists. In 1999, he was forced to resign his position as NEJMs editor-in-chief when the journal's publisher, the Massachusetts Medical Society, chose not to renew his contract. This decision was reportedly rooted in a dispute over marketing of the journal's name.

References

1932 births
Living people
The New England Journal of Medicine people
Medical journal editors
Tufts University School of Medicine faculty
Physicians from Buffalo, New York
University at Buffalo alumni
American nephrologists
Members of the National Academy of Medicine